Moses Lapham (October 16, 1808 – 1838) was a soldier in the Texas Army during the Texas Revolution, noted for a daring action during the Battle of San Jacinto that helped seal the decisive Texian victory.

Early years

Moses Lapham was born near the town of Smithfield, Rhode Island on October 16, 1808 to Amos and Marcy Aldrich Lapham. He moved to Mechanicsburg, Ohio with his father and attended college at Miami University in Oxford, Ohio, for a few years.

Career
Lapham arrived in Texas in the middle of 1831, and he taught school at San Felipe, Texas. He lived in the household of Thomas H. Borden, while assisting Borden with surveying work for about a year. Lapham spent three years in Ohio. However, by December 1835, he had returned to Texas and resumed work as a surveyor.

Lapham enlisted in the Texas Army on February 23, 1836 and served as a scout. When General Sam Houston evacuated his troops from Gonzalez, Texas, Lapham was one of three sentinels who did not receive the orders. At one point, he was close enough to the advancing Mexican forces to be seen. Eventually he abandoned his post and fled to safety.

In 1836 he enlisted in the Texas army, was a member of Captain Moseley Baker's "San Felipe Company", and fought at the Battle of San Jacinto, where he was one of the men who destroyed Vince's Bridge. The others who were with him on that mission were Deaf Smith, John Coker, Dimer W. Reaves, Young Perry Alsbury, John T. Garner and Edwin R. Rainwater.

After his release from the Army in the fall of 1836, Lapham rejoined Gail and Thomas Borden to work as a surveyor. He helped to lay out the new town of Houston, Texas in October 1836.

Death
Lapham was later employed as a deputy surveyor by Samuel Maverick of San Antonio to survey land for him. The party of five, (Mr. Maverick, the sixth member had returned home was on October 20, 1838) was attacked by Comanche Indians on Leon Creek about four miles from San Antonio, Texas and Moses Lapham, Cornelius Skinner, a Mr. Jones, and one other of the party were killed. The surviving members returned to town and spread the news.  Thirteen prominent men headed by Benjamin Franklin Cage, a San Jacinto veteran, hurriedly left San Antonio and went to the place where the massacre had occurred. The Indians, estimated at a hundred or more, surrounded the Texans and killed Captain Cage, Dr. Henry G. McClung, R. M. Lee, a Mr. O'Blye, Peter Conrad, John Pickering and a Mr. Green, and badly wounded General Richard Dunlap and Major William H. Patton.  The next day a search party brought in the remains of the dead. On the following day, their remains were interred in a single grave just outside the Catholic Cemetery.  Judge Robinson delivered the funeral oration.

See also
John Coker
Young Perry Alsbury
John T. Garner
Edwin R. Rainwater
Denmore W. Reaves
Vince's Bridge
Battle of San Jacinto
Deaf Smith
Henry Wax Karnes
Sam Houston
Antonio López de Santa Anna
Vicente Filisola
José de Urrea
Martín Perfecto de Cos
Juan Almonte
Timeline of the Texas Revolution
Runaway Scrape
Benjamin Franklin Cage

References

Sources
” Daughters of the Republic of Texas, Muster Rolls of the Texas Revolution (Austin, 1986).
” Joseph Milton Nance, Attack and Counterattack: The Texas-Mexican Frontier, 1842 (University of Texas Press, 1964).
” The Writings of Sam Houston, 1813-1863 (University of Texas Press, 1938)
http://www.findagrave.com/cgi-bin/fg.cgi?page=gr&GSln=lapham&GSfn=moses&GSbyrel=all&GSdyrel=all&GSob=n&GRid=129246629&df=all&

Further reading
 

People from Texas
People of the Texas Revolution
1808 births
1838 deaths
People from Smithfield, Rhode Island
People from Mechanicsburg, Ohio